The 1952–53 Scottish Division B was won by Stirling Albion who, along with second placed Hamilton Academical, were promoted to the Division A. Albion Rovers finished bottom.

Table

References 

 Scottish Football Archive

Scottish Division Two seasons
2
Scot